"Freaky Like Me" is a song by the Norwegian urban duo Madcon, released on 20 September 2010 as the second single from their fourth album Contraband. The song features vocals from Belgian-Tunisian singer Ameerah, and was written by Ameerah, TJ Oosterhuis, Arjang "DreamRoc'a" Shishegar, Tshawe Baqwa and Yosef Wolde-Mariam and produced by Norwegian producer DreamRoc'a, also known as Sha, and TJ Oosterhuis. It reached number one in Norway, making it their third number one in the country and their third biggest international hit.

Track listing

German premium CD single
"Freaky Like Me" (feat. Ameerah) - 3:10
"Glow" (Radio Edit) - 3:49

German standard CD single
"Freaky Like Me" (feat. Ameerah) (Main Mix) - 3:06
"Freaky Like Me" (feat. Ameerah) (Instrumental) - 3:06

Credits and personnel
Lead vocals – Madcon 
Backing vocals – DreamRoc'a
Female vocals – Ameerah
Music – ≈ Arjang "DreamRoc'a" Shishegar, TJ Oosterhuis
Lyrics – Ameerah, Arjang "DreamRoc'a" Shishegar, TJ Oosterhuis, Tshawe Baqwa & Yosef Wolde-Mariam

Charts

Weekly charts

Year-end charts

Certifications and sales

See also
 List of number-one hits in Norway in 2010

References

2010 songs
2010 singles
Madcon songs
Ameerah (singer) songs
Number-one singles in Norway
Songs written by Tjeerd Oosterhuis
Songs written by Ameerah (singer)